Odela Railway Station is a 2022 Indian Telugu-language crime thriller film directed by Ashok Teja and created by Sampath Nandi. Produced by K. K. Radhamohan's Sri Sathya Sai Arts, the film has an ensemble cast of Hebah Patel, Pujita Ponnada, Vasishta N. Simha and Sai Ronak. Odela Railway Station is based on the real incidents that happened in Odela, India. It was premiered on Aha on 26 August 2022.

Plot 
Odela Railway Station revolves around a serial killer who kills all the newly married women in a village named Odela. A young trainee IPS officer, who is posted to the village, is assigned the case of finding the culprit behind the murders. How does he find the killer? Who's The Serial Killer? is the rest of the film.

Cast 
 Hebah Patel as Radha
 Pujita Ponnada as Spoorthi
 Vasishta N. Simha as Tirupati, Radha's husband 
 Sai Ronak as IPS officer Anudeep
 Naga Mahesh
 Gagan Vihari

Production 
Vasishta N. Simha was cast in the film in 2020 which was reported to be his debut in Telugu cinema. But due to the delay in the production, his next film in Tollywood, that is, Narappa (2021) became his debut in Telugu cinema ultimately. Speaking about his character in the film, Simha told to The Times of India that "When the team narrated the story that revolves around a true incident, I was immediately sold and agreed to do it. They told me that they were ready to shoot the moment I gave a go ahead. Soon enough, I was on a flight to Hyderabad and prepping for this film. It was a good experience, as the team was very passionate. I speak a dialect of Telugu from Telangana in the film, so that added to the challenge".

Second schedule of shooting was began in October 2020 after being halted due to heavy rains in Telangana.

Release and reception 
After several delays in the production, the film was premiered on Aha on 26 August 2022.

Narendra Puppala of The Hans India wrote that "Dipping into real-life happenings, the realistic crime thriller set in a rural milleu maintains the suspense till the climax, without resorting to the worn-out cliches normally associated with the genre". Shyamala Tulasi of Sakshi Post gave a rating of 3 out of 5 and stated:"Odela Railway Station is a  movie which has its high moments. The film does pique the curiosity of the audience but fails to deliver in some places predictable movie at some points." In contrast, 123Telugu wrote that "Odela Railway Station is a badly made crime thriller. Except for a couple of scenes and the lead cast performances, there is nothing exciting about this film".

References

External links 

 
 Odela Railway Station on Aha

2022 films
Aha (streaming service) original films
2022 crime thriller films
Indian crime thriller films
Films shot in Hyderabad, India
Films set in 2002
Films set in Telangana
2020s Telugu-language films